Nathaniel Andrew Garcia Alquiros (born 27 July 1992) is a Filipino professional footballer who plays as a midfielder for Philippines Football League club Stallion Laguna and the Philippines national team.

Collegiate career
Nathaniel played for the football team of his college, De La Salle University in the UAAP.

Career

Stallion Laguna
Alquiros spent his professional career with Stallion Laguna.

International career

Philippines U-23
In March 2015, Alquiros received a call-up for Philippines U-23 to compete at the 2016 AFC U-23 Championship qualification that was held in Thailand. In 31 March 2015, He made his debut for the Philippines U-23 team in a 3–1 defeat against Cambodia U-23.

Alquiros was part of the Philippines U-23 squad that competed in the 2015 SEA Games.

Philippines
In December 2017, he took part at the 2017 CTFA International Tournament though the squad that played in the friendly tournament in Taiwan was mentored by Marlon Maro in lieu of regular head coach Thomas Dooley. Alquiros made his debut for the Philippines in a 1–0 loss against Timor Leste.

In October 2018, Alquiros was once again called up for the Philippines, he was included in the final 21-man squad that will participate in the 2018 Bangabandhu Cup.

Career Statistics

Club

References

External links
 

1992 births
Living people
Association football midfielders
Filipino footballers
Philippines international footballers
University Athletic Association of the Philippines footballers
De La Salle University alumni